Silvia Eduardo Panguana (born 16 February 1993 in Maputo) is a Mozambican track and field hurdler. At the 2012 Summer Olympics, she competed in the Women's 100 metres hurdles.

References

External links

1993 births
Living people
Mozambican female hurdlers
Olympic athletes of Mozambique
Athletes (track and field) at the 2012 Summer Olympics
Athletes (track and field) at the 2010 Summer Youth Olympics
Commonwealth Games competitors for Mozambique
Athletes (track and field) at the 2014 Commonwealth Games
Sportspeople from Maputo